Umm ar-Rehan (meaning "Mother of Basil"; also transliterated Umm Rihan or Um al-Rehan) is a Palestinian village of 370 inhabitants located high on the northwestern hills of the Jenin Governorate,  from Jenin. It is one of a number of Palestinian villages that are now located within enclaves in the Seam Zone

Umm al-Rehan  is one of seven villages that form part of the Barta'a enclave,  which is named for the enclave's largest town: eastern Barta'a (pop. 3,500).

History
Pottery remains from the Hellenistic and  the Roman eras have been found here. In Roman times, the town of Umm ar-Rehan covered an area of 36-40 hectares, consisting of approximately a hundred houses, a road system, and a Roman bathhouse.

Archaeological artifacts dating back to Byzantine times have also been uncovered here.

Ottoman era
In 1882, the PEF's Survey of Western Palestine described the place as having "traces of ruins; drafted stones of good sized masonry [..] West of it in the valley is a ruined watchtower".

British Mandate era
In the 1922 census of Palestine conducted by the British Mandate authorities, Kh. Umm Al-Rihan had a population of 26, all Muslims.

The wood near the village is the site of a memorial to early Palestinian militant leader Izz ad-Din al-Qassam of the Black Hand, killed in a gunfight with the British Palestine Police Force.

In the 1945 statistics, the population of  Umm ar-Rihan was counted with that of Ya'bad, in an official land and population survey.

Under the 1947 United Nations partition plan for Palestine, Umm ar-Rehan was to form part of an Arab Palestinian state.

post 1948
After the 1948 Arab-Israeli war, Umm ar-Rehan fell under de facto Jordanian rule like other towns and villages in the West Bank, and since the 1967 Six-Day War, Umm ar-Rihan has been under Israeli occupation.

On August 27, 1998, the Israel Defense Forces (IDF) used bulldozers to uproot thousands of fruits trees on tens of dunums of land belonging to Umm ar-Rehan and az-Zawiya villages to prepare the ground for the construction of two new settlements. On October 10, 2000, more land belonging to Umm ar-Rehan was bulldozed to expand the Shaked and Hinnanit settlements.

In the months following the outbreak of the Second Intifada, Israeli checkpoints were erected on the eastern and southern roads to nearby Tura al-Gharbiya and Ya'bad, limiting access to the rest of the West Bank; the checkpoints were preserved as crossings in the Israeli West Bank barrier. Umm ar-Rehan's location in area east of the Green Line and west of the Israeli West Bank barrier is often referred to as the "Seam Zone".

Present-day
Umm ar-Rehan is under the Palestinian National Authority's civil administration as per the Oslo Accords. There is one primary school run by the PNA, but no secondary school, clinic or other medical facilities. Um ar-Rehan residents can access the clinic in Barta'a Sharqiyya by way of an unpaved road. The 4,700 people who live in the Barta'a area enclave depend on this government clinic which has a pharmacy and also offers counseling on health awareness, but lacks medical specialists, laboratory testing and family planning services.

The main terminal to enter and exit the Barta'a Sharqiya-Um ar-Rehan enclave is Imreiha (Reikhan). In November 2004, it was open between 6am and 10am to Palestinians with green permits only. In August 2006, it was open between 7am and 9am between which times Israeli goods and produce enter the enclave area. Produce from the village for export to Israel is sent out only with prior coordination with the Israeli authorities.

On 30 April 2004, armed Israeli settlers entered the village and fired shots in the air before briefly taking over the primary school. They threatened to "expel" the Palestinians, urging them to go to nearby Ya'bad on the other side of the separation barrier. An official from the Education Ministry of the Palestinian National Authority and villager Faruat Zaid said they tried to contact the IDF about the raid, but there had been no response. Both the IDF and police said they had been unaware of the incident.

Environment
A 2,500 ha in the vicinity of the village, the Um Al-Reehan Nature Reserve, encompassing mainly remnant forested land, has been recognised as an Important Bird Area (IBA) by BirdLife International because it supports a resident population of Egyptian vultures.

References

Bibliography

External links
  Welcome To Kh. Umm al-Rihan
Survey of Western Palestine, Map 8: IAA, Wikimedia commons 
Google map

Seam Zone
Jenin Governorate
Villages in the West Bank
Municipalities of the State of Palestine
Important Bird Areas of the State of Palestine